Rendon or Rendón is a surname. Notable people with the surname include:

Ana Rendón (born 1986), Colombian archer
Andrés Rendón, Colombian karateka
Anthony Rendon (born 1990), American baseball player
Anthony Rendon (politician), American politician
Daniel Rendón Herrera, Colombian drug trafficker
Del Rendon (1965–2005), American musician
Estanislao Rendón (1806-1874), Venezuelan politician 
James Rendón (born 1985), Colombian racewalker
John Toro Rendón (born 1958), Colombian football referee
Juan José Rendón (born 1964), Venezuelan publicist
 Manuel Rendon (born 1987), Venezuelan engineer
Manuel Rendón Seminario (1894–1982), Ecuadorian painter
María Chacón Rendón, Bolivian lawyer and politician
Marianne Rendón, American actress
Valentina Rendón (born 1975), Colombian actress and singer